Natech S.A. is a Greek independent software vendor.

History
The company was founded in 2003 following a transformation of a previous legal entity under the trading name Computer Store. It focused on delivering software and IT services mainly to credit related institutions like Cooperative Banks and Credit Unions in Greece.

In 2010, it became a Microsoft Silver ISV Partner. In 2011, Natech implemented its web banking suite to 4 Cooperative Banks, started to deploy its core banking solutions to currency exchange firms and payment institutions, and was certified ISO 9001:2008. In 2012, Natech was awarded the project to implement the software for payments and transfers within the SEPA union for Greece's Loan and Consignment Fund, the largest fund in Greece. And establishes a branch in Athens. As of 2012, Natech had served over 10 out of 16 of the Greek Cooperative Banks with its Core Banking Solution. It opened a second branch in Athens and established a global partnership network to cater to the SME Banking Sector

In 2016, the Cooperative Bank of Epirus launched a video customer service using Skype for Business in conjunction with Natech products. In 2018 Natech launched CSB2, a new banking software, and became a reseller of the aplonAPI of PaymentComponents.

Awards 

 2017: Greece Startup/Scale Awards for its integrated innovation effort

References

Software companies of Greece
Banking software companies
Financial software companies
Greek brands
Companies based in Ioannina